In philosophy, spiritualism is the notion, shared by a wide variety of systems of thought, that there is an immaterial reality that cannot be perceived by the senses. This includes philosophies that postulate a personal God, the immortality of the soul, or the immortality of the intellect or will, as well as any systems of thought that assume a universal mind or cosmic forces lying beyond the reach of purely materialistic interpretations. Generally, any philosophical position, be it dualism, monism, atheism, theism, pantheism, idealism or any other, is compatible with spiritualism as long as it allows for a reality beyond matter. Theism is an example of a dualist spiritualist philosophy, while pantheism is an example of monist spiritualism.

Notable spiritualist thinkers
Aristotle
Henri Bergson
Maine de Biran
F. H. Bradley
Victor Cousin
René Descartes
Giovanni Gentile
William Ernest Hocking
Louis Lavelle
René Le Senne
Gottfried Wilhelm Leibniz
Pindar
Plato
Josiah Royce

See also
Metaphysics
Spiritualism (religious movement)
Alfred Russel Wallace's religious spiritualism

Notes

Spiritualism
Metaphysics of religion